Jeeva is a 2014 Indian Tamil-language sports film written and directed by Suseenthiran, who also produces the film along with cinematographer R. Madhi and art director Rajeevan under the banner of Vennila Kabadi Team. The film stars Vishnu and Sri Divya, while Lakshman Narayan plays a supporting role. Its music was composed by D. Imman, cinematography was handled by R. Madhi and editing was by Anthony L. Ruben, while dialogue was written by Santhosh. The film opened to positive reviews from critics on 27 September 2014 and become a successful venture at the box office.

Plot
This film is about a young aspiring cricketer Jeeva, who dreams of playing for the India national cricket team one day. The films begins with Jeeva, sitting in a park bench and starts to narrate his life story. He is a lower middle-class boy, who from the very young age is interested in cricket. He sees Sachin Tendulkar as his idol. Though his father initially does not support him, he later starts to do so on the request of his friend. Jeeva grows up and becomes a part of the school team. He excels in his game and turns out to be a star player. Seeing his performances, a local cricket club offers him a chance to join and train with them, for which his father disagrees saying that his academic performance is poor due to cricket and he may not get a job in future. In between Jeeva falls in love with his neighbour girl and they are broken up when their family discovers this. Jeeva starts to drink due to this heartbreak. So to make him concentrate on good deeds again, Jeeva's father agrees to let him join the cricket club.

Jeeva becomes a sensation at the club, scoring good runs in every game. His opening Partner Ranjith initially has ego clashes with Jeeva, but later they become close friends and produce great performances. They both develop and their team starts to enter higher division competitions. In the meantime, Jeeva's school time crush Jenny meets him back and they start loving again. However, he gets pressured into marrying her and pleads for a chance after getting selected. Then comes the tournament that selects the players for the Tamil Nadu Ranji Trophy team and as expected both Jeeva and Ranjith get selected. But the real trouble starts after joining the Team. The Tamil Nadu team mostly comprises players from a particular community and since Jeeva and Ranjith are from a different community, they are sidelined for most of the games. They are given chances in tough conditions where it's hard to score more runs. But still they manage to put up a decent performance. Jeeva even once gets applauded by the Captain of the Rajasthan team, who is a veteran national team member. But getting dropped in the upcoming games affects their average and their subsequent chances of getting into the team for future games. Angered by being rejected from the team, Ranjith storms into the Association office and blasts at the chairman for showing partiality towards that community and leaves with a heavy heart. Both Jeeva and Ranjith feel that their cricketing career is over. Ranjith commits suicide and Jeeva is heartbroken. Jenny's father even agrees for their marriage and promises a job for Jeeva, provided he converts to Christianity and quits cricket. Jeeva initially agrees but immediately tells Jenny that he cannot live without Cricket and Jenny leaves him. Jeeva returns to training and he practices even harder waiting for a magic to happen that will revive his cricketing career.

And the magic happens after sometime, when his Coach gets a call from the Rajasthan CPL(ipl) team franchise, to offer Jeeva a chance to play in the upcoming season of CPL. Jeeva learns that it was the Rajasthan Team Captain who applauded him during the Ranji Trophy match, has suggested his name for the CPL. Jeeva is awestruck. He is very happy as his coach says that if he performs well in the CPL, he can directly enter the national team. He and his family celebrate this as he reunites with Jenny.

The story returns to the present, where Jeeva actually gives interview to TV channels, as a star player of the national cricket team. He narrates his experience on his debut CPL match, where he smashes the very first ball he faces for a sixer, and he puts up a great performance time and again which seals his place in the national team. Jeeva ends his interview by saying that "in other countries, players lose by playing; But only in India, the players lose even without getting a chance to participate".

Cast

 Vishnu as Jeeva
 Sri Divya as Jenny
 Akila as Vishnu's sister
 Soori as David (Senior)
 Lakshman Narayan as Ranjith
 Sanyathara as Preethi
 Ravi as the cricket coach
 Charlie as Arul Pragasam
 Madhusudhan Rao as Partha Sarathy
 T. Siva as Jenny's father
 G. Marimuthu as Jeeva's father
 Monica Chinnakotla as Jenny's sister
 Sanjay Bharathi as DCA Team cricketer
 Udhayabhanu Maheswaran as Raghavan
 Bava Lakshmanan
 Arya as the CPL cameraman (cameo appearance)
 Natarajan Subramaniam in a cameo appearance in the song "Oru Rosa"
 Surabhi in a cameo appearance in the song "Oruthi Mele"
 Varun Chakravarthy in a cameo appearance as a club cricketer

Production
Soon after wrapping up production works of Rajapattai, Suseenthiran announced in October 2011 that he would shortly start his next venture featuring Vishnu. The film titled Veera Dheera Sooran was said to be an original story, to be made simultaneously in Tamil and Telugu. In early 2012, it was reported that director Pandiraj would write the film's dialogues. However the director opted to concentrate on other projects before starting the film. He subsequently began a different project with Vishnu and production work on the film began again in August 2013. The project initially began as a bilingual, with Sundeep Kishan selected to portray the lead role in the Telugu version, but scheduling problems meant that the version was dropped. Sri Divya was signed on to play a college girl in the film after the director was impressed with her performance in Varuthapadatha Valibar Sangam. Surabhi, who debuted in Ivan Veramathiri was signed as another heroine. She had to opt out later due to conflicting schedules. Vinoth Kishan was initially signed to play a supporting role, but was later replaced by Lakshman Narayan, who had played the lead role in Bharathiraja's Annakodi (2013). The title of the film was officially announced to be Jeeva in January 2014.

Soundtrack

The film's score and soundtrack are composed by D. Imman under Sony Music India's label. The film notably had its songs' lyrics written by Vairamuthu and his two sons Madhan Karky and Kabilan Vairamuthu, becoming the first such album to have the trio from the same family. A launch event was held on 12 September 2014.

Track list

Release
Actors Vishal Reddy's Vishal Film Factory and Arya's The Show People banner bought Tamil Nadu theatrical rights of the film in September 2014. The satellite rights of the film were sold to STAR Vijay. The film was released on 27 September 2014

Reception
The film was released to positive reviews. The Times of India gave the film 3 stars out of 5 and wrote, "Suseenthiran pads up the film with the tropes that the genre needs. Though it has its heart in the right place the problem with Jeeva is that it is uneven. Cricket takes a backseat every time the director decides to focus on the love angle, taking some fizz out of the film". The Hindu wrote, "A film has stayed true to its soul if it replays in your mind long after you’ve left the theatre. In most parts, Jeeva does that". Indo-Asian News Service gave 3 stars out of 5 and wrote, "Jeeva is gripping with a moving second half, but not as inspiring as Nagesh Kukunoor's Bollywood film Iqbal. Suseenthiran's desperate act to portray his film as a commercial entertainer and not as a sports-drama doesn't go down too well. It somehow distracts you from the film's core subject and that's a big letdown. If only these crucial comprises were handled with care, the film would've been highly satisfying". Sify wrote, "Jeeva is sure to provide inspiration to many youngsters with similar cricket dreams and aspirations...it is a nice entertaining film, and another feather on the director's cap". Rated 3.25 out of 5 by Cinemalead-" Commendable cricketer!"

References

External links
 

2014 films
Films about cricket in India
Films directed by Suseenthiran
2010s Tamil-language films